Ophonus puncticeps is a species of ruderal ground beetle native to the Palearctic realm, including Europe and the Near East.

Description
The species is black coloured with brownish legs and antennas.

Distribution
In Ireland, it was believed to be found in Belfast, where it was first found in 1902. At first, it turned out to be Harpalus puncticollis, a species described by Paykull in the same year. But, later on it was confirmed that it was actually Ophonus rufibarbis.

References

External links
Ophonus puncticeps on Bug Guide

puncticeps
Beetles of Europe
Beetles described in 1828